Hans de Wolf (born 12 February 1955) is a Dutch television, documentary and film producer. He is also a guest tutor at the Netherlands Film Academy and the Maastricht Academy of Dramatic Arts. 
From 1985 to 1989 Hans was director of the Netherlands Film Festival. From 1990 onwards he was producer at production company Egmond Film & Television, winner of the Academy Award for Best Foreign Language Film at the 68th Academy Awards with the film Antonia's Line. From 2008 until 2021 he was the co-founder and producer of production company KeyFilm together with Hanneke Niens. 

During his career Hans de Wolf won numerous awards both as producer and with KeyFilm. 
Notable awards are the Prix Europa Television Programme of the Year for the telemovie Chopsticks (1996), the Golden Calf Best long feature film for Nynke (2001) and two Platinum Films for box office hits Soof 1 and Soof 2.

Selected filmography

Feature films
 The Pointsman (1986) (screenplay)
 Antonia's Line (1995)
 The Stowaway (1997)
 Nynke (2001)
 Oysters at Nam Kee's (2002)
 Johan (2005)
 Duska (2007)
 Katia's Sister (2008)
 Richting west (2010)
 Silent City (2012)
 Soof (2013)
 Nena (2014)
 Ventoux (2015)
 Ya tayr el tayer (The Idol) (2015)
 Beyond Sleep (2016)
 Kamp Holland (2016)
 Soof 2 (2016)
 Craving (2017)
 The Reports on Sarah and Saleem (2018)
 The Beast in the Jungle (2019)
Tench (2020)
The Warden (2020)

Television
 Chopsticks (1995) (screenplay)
 Mates (1999)
 Ochtendzwemmers (2001)
 De ordening (2003)
 Bluebird (2004)
 Maite was hier (2009)
 Bowy is binnen (2012)
 Soof: a new beginning (two seasons, 2017-2018)
Swanenburg (2021)

Documentaries
 Ave Maria – Van dienstmaagd des heren tot koningin van de hemel (2006)
 This is my picture when I was dead (2010)
 De man met 100 kinderen (2012)
 Ik ben Alice (2015)
 Erbarme dich (2015)

References

External links
 
 KeyFilm Feature films
 KeyFilm Television
 KeyFilm Documentaires

1955 births
Living people
Dutch film producers
Dutch television producers
Film festival directors
Mass media people from The Hague